Momentum Under the Influence is a surf movie distributed by Steelhouse Distribution and produced by Poor Specimen.  It features all the best surfers in the world under 23 that surf places like Mentawai Islands, Australia, South Africa, France, Timor Island, Indonesia, Mexico, Hawaii and California.  Surfers include CJ Hobgood, Damien Hobgood, Paul Roach Dan Malloy, David Rastovich, Mick Fanning, Taj Burrow, Joel Parkinson, Ben Bourgois, Bruce Irons, Andy Irons, and Dean Morrison.

Music 
Artists include At The Drive-In, Refused, CKY, Pinback, Shellac, No Knife, Pressure 4-5, International Noise Conspiracy, Backyard Babies, Turing Machine, Chevelle, Jimmy Eat World.

Notes

External links 
 http://www.poorspecimen.com/
 http://www.surfline.com

2000s English-language films